San Miguel Totocuitlapilco in nahuatl ("in the tail of the bird") is a village located inside the Municipality of Metepec. It has a population of 377 and is 2600 meters above sea level.

This place is situated near Toluca, State of Mexico, Mexico, its geographical coordinates are 19° 13' 44" North, 99° 35' 39" West.

References
PueblosAmérica

External links
 Images

Populated places in the State of Mexico
Metepec, State of Mexico